The 1911 Copa de Honor Cousenier was the final match to decide the winner of the Copa de Honor Cousenier, the 7th. edition of the international competition organised by the Argentine and Uruguayan Associations together. The final was contested by Uruguayan side CURCC and Argentine club Newell's Old Boys. 

The match was held in the Estadio Gran Parque Central in Montevideo, on November 5, 1911. With CURCC winning 2–0, players of Newell's left the field under protest after the referee validated both goals. Newell's alleged that those goals had been scored with players in offside position. Nevertheless, the title was awarded to CURCC, which won its second consecutive Copa Cousenier trophy.

Qualified teams 

Note

Match details 

|

References

1911 in Argentine football
1911 in Uruguayan football
Peñarol matches
Newell's Old Boys matches